The Novara–Varallo railway is a regional railway line of Piedmont in Italy, that connect Varallo to Novara railway node, crossing the countries of Valsesia. From 2015 is used only as a tourist railway and for freight service in the tract Novara-Romagnano Sesia.

The tourist service is performed by historic trains of Fondazione FS, operated by Trenitalia, on specific dates. Regular passenger service was suspended from 15 September 2014, by decision of the Piedmont Region.

History
The railway was opened from 1883 to 1886.

See also 
 List of railway lines in Italy

References

Footnotes

Sources
 
 

Railway lines in Piedmont
Railway lines opened in 1886
Romagnano Sesia